The 1984–85 Eredivisie season was the 25th season of the Eredivisie, the top level of ice hockey in the Netherlands. Ten teams participated in the league, and the Amstel Tijgers Amsterdam won the championship.

First round

Final round

External links
Nederlandse IJshockey Bond

Neth
Eredivisie (ice hockey) seasons
Ere